Stewart v. Abend, 495 U.S. 207 (1990), was a United States Supreme Court decision holding that a successor copyright owner (one who obtains ownership later on, such as the heirs of a copyright owner who dies) has the exclusive right to permit the creation and exploitation of derivative works, regardless of potentially conflicting agreements by prior copyright holders.

Facts
Cornell Woolrich originally wrote the short story "It Had to Be Murder", and sold the publication rights to Popular Publications, Inc., which published the story in its Dime Detective Magazine (February 1942 issue). Three years later, Woolrich sold the movie rights to a production company, and agreed by contract to renew those rights when the 28-year copyright (then in force) expired. In 1953 the movie rights were bought for $10,000 by Patron Inc., a production company formed by actor James Stewart and director Alfred Hitchcock. The short story was then made into the acclaimed movie Rear Window (1954), directed by Hitchcock and starring Stewart.

Woolrich died in 1968, before the expiration of his 28-year copyright, and control of the literary rights passed to his executor, Chase Manhattan Bank. Chase sold the movie rights for $650 to literary agent Sheldon Abend. Abend refused to honor Woolrich's original agreement to renew the copyright and assign it to the owner of the movie rights, and instead sued Stewart when the movie was shown on television.

Opinion of the Court
The question presented was whether the owner of a legal derivative work infringes the rights of the successor copyright owner, by continued distribution and publication of the derivative work during the renewal term of the pre-existing work. The Court held that the assignment was an unfulfilled contingency that died with the author; the successor can prevent continued use of the derivative work.

In justifying its decision, the Court noted that control of the work reverts to the author—or author’s successors—when renewal comes up. This protects the author (and the heirs) from being deprived of the surprising value of the work.

See also
 List of United States Supreme Court cases, volume 495
 List of United States Supreme Court cases
 Lists of United States Supreme Court cases by volume
 List of United States Supreme Court cases by the Rehnquist Court

References

External links

United States copyright case law
United States Supreme Court cases
United States Supreme Court cases of the Rehnquist Court
1990 in United States case law